On 14 December 2012 between 7 and 8 a.m. local time, a 36-year-old villager identified as Min Yongjun stabbed 24 people, including 23 children and an elderly woman, in a knife attack at Chenpeng Village Primary School, Wenshu Township, Guangshan County, Henan province, China. The children targeted by the knifeman are thought likely to be between six and eleven years of age. The attack occurred as the children were arriving for classes probably at 8:00 or maybe even 9:00.

The incident has followed other school attacks in China since 2010 by mentally disturbed perpetrators involved in personal disputes or unhappy with the rapid changes occurring in Chinese society. Security guards had been posted at schools across China, with all schools to have a security guard by 2013.

Stabbing
Due to strict gun control laws in China, knives are usually the weapon of choice in violent crimes. The attack on the children occurred at the entrance of the school. Min first targeted the elderly woman, aged 85, who lived next to the school. He went to her house at around 7 a.m., stole one of her knives and attacked her head. The woman's daughter said an argument had occurred. At around 7:40 a.m., Min pursued the children with the knife he had stolen from the elderly woman's house and slashed them, many on their heads. Xinhua reported that some of the children had had fingers or ears cut off in the knife attack.

Min was restrained at the primary school, and transferred to police custody. The victims were treated at three hospitals. Two of the children were taken to hospitals located outside Guangshan County to receive better care. None of the victims were fatally wounded.

Perpetrator
The suspect was initially identified to be Min Yingjun; however, later reports identified the perpetrator to be a different man, Min Yongjun, of the same village as Min Yingjun. He is reported to have had a long history of epileptic seizures, and to have been influenced by the 2012 doomsday phenomenon. This has been allegedly propagated in China by the Eastern Lightning church.

Response
The Guangshan County government established an emergency response team for the incident. The coverage of the incident in local media was tightly controlled, with Beijing usually restricting coverage of such sensitive topics to dissuade copycat attacks, and an article in the Financial Times reported a backlash by Chinese citizens due to the lack of coverage of the school stabbings. An article in The Associated Press similarly wrote that a possible reason why authorities wanted to restrict the news was to either "prevent encouraging others or to play down the crime to keep blame off the government."

Officials detained 52 people for spreading doomsday rumours, such as distributing leaflets.

On 16 December, the suspect was arrested and charged with the crime of endangering public safety by dangerous means.

Six officials were fired. The reason for the dismissals has not been announced.

Reactions
Some commentaries situated the knife attacks in the wider context of China's social and economic transformation, noting the inadequacies in the country's health care system for diagnosing and treating citizens with psychiatric distress and illnesses.

As the Chenpeng school attack was followed by the Sandy Hook Elementary School shooting in the United States hours later comparisons were drawn between the two. The difference in gun control laws between the two countries was used to explain the disparity in casualties of the school attacks by journalists and politicians, including U.S. Representative Jerry Nadler, and an article in the Associated Press noted that despite the different outcomes, an underlying commonality between the attacks was the increased frequency of school attacks because, "attackers often seek out the vulnerable, hoping to amplify their outrage before they themselves often commit suicide."

Comparisons were also drawn between the incident handling by the local and national governments involved. The lack of coverage by Chinese state-run news channels, and the lack of any emotional response from the Chinese government at all levels were contrasted to the detailed US media coverage and then-US President Barack Obama's national speech, including his commitment to tackle the underlying issues.

Footage
The local police released footage from a security camera showing the attacker barging into the school and attacking a student. The video was noted and analysed by many news agencies, and contributed significantly to the widespread coverage of the incident.

See also
 List of attacks related to primary schools

Notes

References

2012 crimes in China
Attacks on schools in China
Crime in China
Crimes against children
Primary schools in China
History of Henan
Mass stabbings in China
Xinyang
Knife attacks
December 2012 crimes